The One Tour may refer to:

 The One Tour, a 1992/93 tour by Elton John.
 The One Tour, a 2000 tour by Alanis Morissette.